Shevin is a given name and a surname. Notable people with the name include:

Mara Sapon-Shevin (born 1951), American educator
Robert L. Shevin (1934–2005), American politician
Shevin Smith (1975–2019), American football player